The Aixam City is a microcar produced by the French manufacturer Aixam.

Models

Mega e-City

Developed in collaboration with NICE, the electric Mega e-City was first shown at the 2006 British International Motor Show, and has been produced by Aixam since March 2007. Until the end of 2008, it was built exclusively for the London market as a right-hand drive vehicle.

Since the end of 2010, the Mega e-City has also been available with a lithium-ion battery. The price of the model in Germany fell from €16,000 gross to less than €15,000 between 2010 and 2020.

Electric variants of the Aixam Pro commercial vehicle range are also available.

City GTO

A sportier-looking version, the Aixam City GTO, has been added to the range.

e-Coupé

Crossline / Crossover

The Crossline and Crossover are crossover-inspired versions of the City.

Safety
The Aixam Crossover GTR was tested in 2016 by Euro NCAP and received a rating of 1 out of 5 stars.

Mega e-Scouty
The Mega e-Scouty is an electric quadricycle that will be launched in early 2023.

Gallery

References

City
Microcars